Arko Okk (born 25 December 1967 in Tallinn) is an Estonian film operator, director and producer.

In 1998 he co-founded (with Jaan Tätte) the production studio OÜ Acuba Film.

Filmography

 "Tulivesi" (1994; feature film; operator)
 "Minu Leninid" (1997; feature film; operator)
 "Ristumine peateega" (1999; feature film; director)
 "Agent Sinikael" (2002; feature film; operator)
 "Sigade revolutsioon" (2004; feature film; operator)
 "Monoloogid" (2011; documental film; director)

References

Living people
1967 births
Estonian cinematographers
Estonian film directors
People from Tallinn